HD 171978 is a binary star system in the Serpens Cauda segment of the equatorial constellation of Serpens. It may be referred to by its Bright Star Catalogue identifier of HR 6993. This system is dimly visible to the naked eye with a combined apparent visual magnitude of 5.76, although is a suspected variable star of unknown type with a magnitude that has been reported to vary between 5.74 and 5.86. HD 171978 is located at a distance of approximately 537 light-years from the Sun based on parallax, and is drifting further away with a barycentric radial velocity of +11.4 km/s. It is a member of the Ursa Major Moving Group.

The binary nature of this system was reported by Canadian astronomer R. M. Petrie in 1948. It is a double-lined spectroscopic binary with an orbital period of 14.7 days and an eccentricity (ovalness) of 0.25. The orbital inclination is estimated to be ~30°. They each show a sharp-lined spectra, indicating their rotation rates are not high. Both are similar A-type main-sequence stars with a combined stellar classification of A0V. In 1970, Geary and Abt noted that the secondary appeared to be an Am star.

References

A-type main-sequence stars
Am stars
Spectroscopic binaries
Suspected variables

Serpens (constellation)
Serpentis, e
Durchmusterung objects
171978
091322
6993